Angelīna Kučvaļska (born 6 December 1998) is a Latvian figure skater. She is the 2014 CS Volvo Open Cup champion, a two-time Toruń Cup champion (2015, 2016), the 2014 Tallinn Trophy champion, and a five-time Latvian national champion (2015–17, 2019–20). She has competed in the final segment at nine ISU Championships, achieving her best result, fourth, at the 2016 European Championships.

Personal life
Angelīna Kučvaļska was born on 6 December 1998 in Saldus, Latvia. Her father died when she was 12 years old. She was a student at Riga 1st secondary school.

Career

Kučvaļska began skating at the age of three and a half years. Jekaterina Platonova is her first and only coach.

2012–2013 season
Kučvaļska became age-eligible for junior internationals in the 2012–2013 season and placed 16th at her sole Junior Grand Prix (JGP) assignment in Courchevel, France. She was selected to represent Latvia at the 2013 World Junior Championships in Milan, Italy. Ranked 22nd in the short program, she qualified to the free skate and finished 20th overall.

2013–2014 season
Kučvaļska competed at two 2013 JGP events, placing 15th in Košice and 19th in Minsk, and won the junior silver medal at the Bavarian Open. She placed 20th in both segments and 19th overall at the 2014 World Junior Championships in Sofia, Bulgaria.

2014–2015 season
Kučvaļska placed seventh at both of her JGP assignments, in Ostrava and Tallinn. Making her senior international debut, she took gold at the 2014 Volvo Open Cup, an ISU Challenger Series (CS) event. Continuing on the senior level, she placed seventh at the CS Warsaw Cup and took gold at the Tallinn Trophy, Latvian Championships, and Toruń Cup. Kučvaļska was named in Latvia's team to the 2015 European Championships in Stockholm, Sweden, and placed 17th in the short program, earning qualification to the next segment. After placing fifth in the free skate, she climbed to seventh overall.

2015–2016 season
Kučvaļska was unable to train in July 2015 due to an ankle injury. She began the 2015–16 season at a pair of CS events, placing 10th at the 2015 Ondrej Nepela Trophy before winning silver at the 2015 Denkova-Staviski Cup. Making her Grand Prix debut, she placed 7th in the short program at the 2015 Trophée Éric Bompard in Bordeaux, France; the event was cancelled due to the November 2015 Paris attacks.

Kučvaļska placed fifth in the short program, fourth in the free skate, and fourth overall at the 2016 European Championships in Bratislava, Slovakia. Her placement was the highest by a Latvian skater at the European Championships until Deniss Vasiljevs won the bronze medal in 2022.

2016–2017 season 
Kučvaļska competed at two Grand Prix events, placing 11th at the 2016 Skate America and 10th at the 2016 Rostelecom Cup. She finished 19th at the 2017 European Championships in Ostrava, Czech Republic, and 22nd at the 2017 World Championships in Helsinki, Finland.

Programs

Competitive highlights 
GP: Grand Prix; CS: Challenger Series; JGP: Junior Grand Prix

References

External links 
 

1998 births
Latvian female single skaters
Living people
Sportspeople from Riga
People from Saldus
Competitors at the 2019 Winter Universiade
Competitors at the 2023 Winter World University Games